Khat Thi (born Zaw Tun, 1976 — 8 March 2021),  was a Burmese revolutionary poet who was killed during the 2021 Myanmar protests in Myanmar. His poems were widely used for Anti-junta resistance movement in Myanmar. Khet Thi was at least the third poet to die during protests since the coup (February 1). He became an icon of the anti-coup protest movement after he was dead. He is considered one of the most prominent heroes of Burma's pro-democracy movement and is remembered as a hero of Myanmar's Democracy.

He was named one of the "Outstanding People's Stars of 2021" by The Irrawaddy.

Career 
From 2004 to 2012, Khat Thi worked as a junior engineer (S.A.E.) on the Development Affairs Committee in Shwebo and Monywa Townships. He had been an engineer before quitting his job in 2012 to focus on his poetry and to support himself by making and selling ice cream and cakes.

His wife Chaw Su, is an officer for the Telecommunications Department who was active in the Civil Disobedience Movement (CDM) of work stoppages in opposition to military rule.

Political activities
Khat Thi was active in the 1996 student uprising and the 2007 Saffron Revolution.  Following the 2021 Myanmar coup d'état, he led anti-military protests in Pale. He wrote a post on Facebook two weeks after the coup;

His poem "Shin Than Chin Shindan" (ရှင်သန်ခြင်း ရှင်းတမ်း) was widely renowned among protesters. One of his most well known lines was, "They shoot in the head, but they don't know the revolution is in the heart." It was a poem that reminded him.
Khat Thi was taken into custody on the night (at around 9PM) of May 8 for questioning at a detention center in the town of Shwebo in central Myanmar that has been the scene of heavy protests against military rule. Although his wife Chaw Su was detained at the Shwebo police station.

He was taken to an undisclosed location and died during his interrogation by the military. His body returned to his family hours later with his internal organs removed
and had bruising on the chest, along the ribs, and on his wrists. But, authorities said that he had died of a heart attack. The junta forces did not disclose any information regarding Khet Thi’s arrest or his cause of death.

His family has brought his body to home on the evening of May 10. His funeral on 10 May 2021 was attended by several thousands of protesters.

About 2,000 people protested in the Black Movementto mark the one-month anniversary of the death of Khat Thi. The protesters then recited poems in memory of Khat Thi and prayed for the fallen martyrs.

Revolutionary poem
"Shin Than Chin Shindan" (Survival Explanations) composed by Khat Thi is used for anti-coup resistance in Myanmar.

References

2021 deaths
Burmese democracy activists
People from Sagaing Region
1976 births
Burmese male poets
21st-century Burmese poets